Filatima betulae is a moth of the family Gelechiidae. It is found in North America, where it has been recorded from Massachusetts.

The wingspan is 19–21 mm. The forewings are brown, overlaid with dark fuscous-tipped greyish-fuscous scales along the costa, indistinctly on the veins 
and broadly on the dorsum. There is an indistinct sordid white spot at the apical fourth and at the tornus, faintly indicating a transverse line. The hindwings are grey, shading to fuscous around the margins.

The larvae feed on Betula populifolia.

References

Moths described in 1947
Filatima